Jessie Lee Hester (born January 21, 1963) is a former professional American football wide receiver who played 11 years in the National Football League for the Los Angeles Raiders, the Atlanta Falcons, the Indianapolis Colts, and the Los Angeles / St. Louis Rams from 1985 to 1995.

He played college football at Florida State University. He finished his college career with 107 catches for 2,100 yards and 21 touchdowns. He was a taken with the 23rd pick in the 1st Round of the 1985 NFL Draft.

In his career, Hester played in 147 games and caught 373 receptions for 5,850 yards and 29 touchdowns.

After retiring from the NFL, Jessie returned home to Belle Glade, Florida to become the head football coach at his alma mater, Glades Central High School. He also owns a home in Wellington, Florida.

On December 17, 2010, Hester was fired from his position of Head Coach at Glades Central High School after guiding the team to a record of 36-4 over three seasons.  Hester had led the Raiders to the playoffs for three consecutive years and appearances in two consecutive state championship games, which they lost. In 2011, he went 3-7 as head football coach at Suncoast High School.

Author Bryan Mealer's book "Muck City" focuses on Hester's life in Belle Glade and the 2010 Glades Central Raiders team he coached. The book was released in October 2012.

In the spring of 2012, Hester became Athletic Director for Lake Worth Community High School. In December 2012, Hester was named football coach.

1963 births
Living people
People from Belle Glade, Florida
African-American players of American football
American football wide receivers
Florida State Seminoles football players
Los Angeles Raiders players
Atlanta Falcons players
Indianapolis Colts players
Los Angeles Rams players
St. Louis Rams players
People from Wellington, Florida
21st-century African-American people
20th-century African-American sportspeople